Alla may refer to:

 Ara Gaya, also called Alla (안라), a city-state kingdom in the part of Gaya confederacy, in modern-day Haman County of Korea

Music
 "Alla" (song) a song by Swedish singer Sofia
 Allá, a rock band from Chicago
 At.Long.Last.A$AP, an album by American rapper A$AP Rocky

People 
 Alla (female name), a Slavic female given name
 Alla (surname), a surname

Places
Alla, Bhutan
Alla, California, aka Alla Station or Alla Junction
Alla, Iran, a village in Semnan Province, Iran

See also
 Alla, the Maltese term for "God"
Allah (الله), the Arabic term for "God"